Metropolitan Evansville Transit System (METS) is a public transit system consisting primarily of bus service in the city of Evansville, Indiana.

History 
The Metropolitan Evansville Transit System was created in 1971 to address  Evansville's growing need for public transportation. Service was limited to the actual city limits; buses ran only once an hour and generally did not run past 6:00 pm.

Over the years, METS has made many adjustments to its service, larger buses were purchased, new routes were added, and vintage trolley service was established in the downtown area, but it was in 1998 that major changes were made.  Several routes expanded service to every 30 minutes, and METS instituted night service that allowed the Buses to run until midnight on heavily traveled routes. In addition METS added service outside the city limits to the University of Southern Indiana just west of Evansville and expanded further east past Burkhart Road. In 1998 METS also established a connection service on the far east and west, with the West Connection being fixed route and primarily used for students at the University of Southern Indiana, and the East Connection which provides curb service and connects to other buses at the Eastland Mall and Lawndale transfer points.

Current Service
METS currently operates 22 fixed city routes and two intercity connection routes. They also run the campus shuttle at the University of Southern Indiana and mobility/para-transit service. Despite the 1998 changes, METS service is still limited; some buses run on Sundays from 6:00 am to 6:00 pm. In addition, no direct bus service exists between Evansville and neighboring Henderson, Kentucky (served by sister agency Henderson Area Rapid Transit), though a recent survey by HART indicated this was the #1 most desired feature by that agency's ridership. METS now meets up with WATS buses for connecting service to Newburgh, Booneville, and Chandler. METS also operates a higher percentage of hybrid-electric transit buses than standard diesel buses and was the first in the state of Indiana to operate them in revenue service.

Routes
Covert Ave A & B
East Connection
First Ave/North Park
Fulton
Howell
Lincoln A & B
Oakhill/Lynch
Mary/Tekoppel A & B
North Main Trolley
Riverside A & B
Shopper Shuttle B (Connects to WATS buses for Newburgh, Chandler, & Booneville)
Stringtown A
Walnut
Washington A & B
West Connection
Red Line (USI Campus Shuttle)
41 connection
Blue Line (USI Campus Shuttle)
Green Line (USI Campus Shuttle)
Mary/Howell (Night Service Only)
Stringtown/First Avenue (Night Service Only)

Fares and Passes
Base fare is $0.75 (children below age 6 ride free when accompanied by a paying rider; limit is 3). Reduced fares of $0.50 are offered to students with student ID. A reduced fare of $0.35 is available for senior citizens, the disabled, and Medicare card holders  via application at the METS office. Riders can also purchase a monthly pass for $60. METS Mobility Fares are $1.50 standard fare, $3.00 convenience fare, and $5.00 for county fare; county fares are any fare inside the Vanderburgh County but outside of Evansville city limits.

References

External links 
 Evansville METS

Bus transportation in Indiana
Transportation in Evansville, Indiana
Transportation in Vanderburgh County, Indiana
Evansville
1971 establishments in Indiana